Zoran Spasojević (Serbian Cyrillic: Зоран Спасојевић; born January 22, 1949, in Kragujevac), is a Serbian writer.

Biography
He has had published fourteen books and one compact disc.

He is also the author of the screenplay for a television comedy serial Without a Title (2000) and a radio drama Short history of alternating standing and falling (2004).

He has been published in more than seventy anthologies and collections of poetry, short stories, short drama and satire. 

In addition to writing, he makes digital graphics and mail art works. His digital graphics can be seen in numerous internet magazines, newspapers and books.

He has received many awards for his works.

He is a member of the Association of drama writers of Serbia and the Association of Serbian writers.

Book
 The Gift of Emptiness (poetry, Kragujevac, 1986)
 Farewell suit (short stories, Belgrade, 1997)
 Hunger (poetry, Kragujevac, 1998),
 Short Stories without Any Trouble (short stories - first edition, Belgrade, 2003)
 America has a hole (drama trilogy, Belgrade, 2003)
 Short Stories without Any Trouble (short stories - second expanded edition, Belgrade, 2006)
 Reservation Serbia (short drama, Belgrade, 2006)
 Gavrilo's Principle (comedy, Belgrade, 2008)
 Do you love me, Jakove (comedy, Belgrade, 2008)
 Here the rabbit drinks water (short satire, Belgrade, 2008)
 A little night mail (e-mail art, Kragujevac, 2009)
 My man (comedy, Belgrade, 2010)
 Hat (short stories, Belgrade, 2018)
 Stories (short stories, Belgrade, 2018)

CD-ROM
 Circus (graphics, books and texts - Kragujevac 2006).

External links
Zoran Spasojević’s blog
Exhibition of Zoran Spasojević

1949 births
Living people
Writers from Kragujevac
Serbian male poets
Serbian male short story writers
Serbian dramatists and playwrights
Serbian screenwriters
Male screenwriters
Serbian artists